The 1959 UCLA Bruins football team was an American football team that represented the University of California, Los Angeles during the 1959 NCAA University Division football season.  In their second year under head coach William F. Barnes, the Bruins compiled a 5–4–1 record (3–1 conference) and finished in a three-way tie for first place in the Athletic Association of Western Universities.

UCLA's offensive leaders in 1959 were quarterback Billy Kilmer with 702 passing yards each, Ray Smith with 417 rushing yards, and Marv Luster with 366 receiving yards.

Schedule

Personnel

Players
 Glen Almquist, end
 Foster Anderson, sophomore tackle
 Harry Baldwin, junior center
 Steve Bauwens, sophomore tackle
 Dean Betts, junior tackle
 Craig Chudy, junior end
 Rod Cochran, senior guard and co-captain
 Dave Dabov, junior guard
 Gene Gaines, junior halfback
 Chuck Hicks, sophomore tackle
 Ron Hull, sophomore center
 Jim Johnson, junior halfback
 Ivory Jones, junior quarterback
 Billy Kilmer, junior tailback
 Tony Longo, junior tackle
 Marv Luster, junior end
 Frank Macari, sophomore guard
 Jack Metcalf, junior guard
 Trusse Norris, senior end
 Paul Oglesby, senior tackle
 Tom Paton, sophomore guard
 Art Phillips, senior quarterback
 John Pierovich, senior end
 Joe Rosenkrans, sophomore halfback
 Marshall Shirk, sophomore guard
 Bob Smith, sophomore halfback
 Earl Smith, junior end
 Skip Smith, senior tailback
 Ray Smith, senior fullback
 Bob Stevens, sophomore fullback
 Al Story, senior tailback
 Don Vena, sophomore end
 Jim Wallace, senior tackle
 Duane Wills, sophomore center
 Fred Zingler, sophomore fullback

Coaches
 Head coach - Bill Barnes
 Assistant coaches - Dan Peterson, John Hermann, Deke Bracket (senior assistant), John Johnson, Sam Boghosian, Jim Dawson, Bob Bergdahl

Other personnel
 Trainer - Ducky Drake
 Assistant trainers - Don Vick, Larry Carter
 Team physician -Dr. Martin Blazina

References

UCLA
UCLA Bruins football seasons
Pac-12 Conference football champion seasons
UCLA Bruins football
UCLA Bruins football